"Flowers" is a song by British-born Canadian singer-songwriter Lauren Spencer-Smith, released as a single on April 14, 2022. It was co-written and produced by Cian Ducrot. The song charted in various countries and is Spencer-Smith's second highest-charting song after "Fingers Crossed".

Background
"Flowers" is a follow-up to Lauren Spencer-Smith's breakthrough hit "Fingers Crossed". Spencer-Smith called the song a "contrast" from the "Fingers Crossed", saying that "'Fingers Crossed' was angry. 'Flowers' is sad." The inspiration of the title came from her realization that her previous relationship was unhealthy when her current boyfriend did nice things for her, such as buying flowers for her, which made her cry; before that she only received flowers as an apology. She also said of the song, "'Flowers' is about looking at a past experience and knowing I deserved more. I want people to be able to contemplate their own situations, and learn from them and heal if they need to. You aren't alone and it gets better."

Composition
The song is a "heartbreak ballad", consisting of "intimate" lyrics accompanied by soft piano. Lyrically, Spencer-Smith details how she realized the toxic state of her last relationship upon transitioning to a healthy, new one.

Guitar version
On June 3, 2022, Spencer-Smith released a guitar version of the song.

Charts

Certifications

References

2022 singles
2022 songs
Lauren Spencer-Smith songs
Songs written by Lauren Spencer-Smith